Satellite Town may refer to:

 Satellite town, a concept of urban planning
 Satellite Town, Lagos, Nigeria
 Satellite Town, Chiniot, Pakistan
 Satellite Town, Gujranwala, Pakistan
 Satellite Town, Jhang, Pakistan
 Satellite Town, Quetta, Pakistan
 Satellite Town, Rawalpindi, Pakistan